Atolen (also Romanized as Ātolen; also known as Ātūlen and Ātūlīn) is a village in Aq Kahriz Rural District, Nowbaran District, Saveh County, Markazi Province, Iran. At the 2006 census, its population was 15, in 6 families.

References 

Populated places in Saveh County